Stockholm County  held a county council election on 14 September 2014 on the same day as the general and municipal elections.

Results
There were 149 seats, the same number as in 2010. The Moderates became the largest party, winning 43 seats, a loss of 14 from the previous election. The party received about 28.2% of the overall vote of 1,355,612.

Municipal & Stockholm ward results
Stockholm Municipality was divided into six separate electoral wards (Södermalm-Enskede, Bromma-Kungsholmen, Norrmalm-Östermalm-Gamla Stan, Östra Söderort, Västra Söderort and Yttre Västerort) and its results were not counted as a unit. These wards have in these lists been translated to English to shorten columns.

References

Elections in Stockholm County
Stockholm county